Leigh Crawford (born 19 April 1946) is a former Australian rules footballer who played for Geelong in the Victorian Football League (now known as the Australian Football League).

References

External links
 
 

1946 births
Living people
Geelong Football Club players
Sunshine Football Club (VFA) players
Australian rules footballers from Victoria (Australia)